Odalys Hernández Benet (born 4 September 1966) is a retired Cuban hurdler.

She won the silver medal at the 1985 Central American and Caribbean Championships (as well as the bronze medal in 100 m hurdles), the silver medal at the 1986 Ibero-American Championships, finished sixth at the 1987 Pan American Games, fifth at the 1988 Ibero-American Championships, won the gold medal at the 1994 Ibero-American Championships, the silver medal at the 1995 Central American and Caribbean Championships and the silver medal at the 1996 Ibero-American Championships. Hernández also became Cuban champion.

In the 4 × 400 metres relay she won a gold medal at the 1986 Central American and Caribbean Games, a gold medal at the 1986 Ibero-American Championships, a bronze medal at the 1988 Ibero-American Championships, and finished sixth at the 1994 Ibero-American Championships. She also competed at the 1987 World Championships without reaching the final.

References

1966 births
Living people
Cuban female hurdlers
World Athletics Championships athletes for Cuba
Central American and Caribbean Games gold medalists for Cuba
Pan American Games competitors for Cuba
Athletes (track and field) at the 1987 Pan American Games
Central American and Caribbean Games medalists in athletics
Competitors at the 1986 Central American and Caribbean Games
20th-century Cuban women
21st-century Cuban women